Eoin McNamee  (1914 - 9 August 1986) was an Irish Republican and former Chief of Staff of the Irish Republican Army.

Background
McNamee (MacNamee) is described as having grown up "in the Sperrin Mountains" of County Tyrone and County Londonderry in Ireland, and received little in the way of formal education. “A scholarly, astute, and sane man, with clear perception he saw that a successful revolutionary effort had to be fought on all levels, including political and agitation, but he remained totally committed to the view that armed struggle was the cutting edge or the spear of efforts, the key to victory.” McNamee was described as being little shy and often quiet, shunning publicity, always working behind the scenes. Pearse Kelly remembered him as being “a solid indestructible man who seemed to have a rock-like tenacity.”

Irish Republican Army
He joined the Irish Republican Army in 1932 Greencastle, County Tyrone before emigrating to London. McNamee took long journeys by bicycle on the narrow mountainous roads of Tyrone and Donegal, resulting in a mass of recruits for the IRA. He was involved in the Republican Congress, an attempt by the far-left in Ireland to form a political party that would be on good terms with the IRA. However, the Republican Congress split between having moderate Republican goals or an explicitly Communist outlook.

Between 1937 and 1939 he lived in England, still operating for the IRA, working as an "intelligence officer". In March and April 1938 he attended IRA conventions in Ireland and was the spokesman for Seán Russell's faction in the voting for a new chief of staff. During this time period he, along with other IRA members who were operating in England, were given a brief introduction into how to create explosives by Seamus O'Donovan and Patrick McGrath (Irish Republican) in support of the 1939-40 IRA bombing campaign against Britain - the S-Plan. The S-Plan was a bombing campaign carried out by the IRA against targets in Great Britain during wartime. During the campaign there were 300 explosions, 10 deaths and 96 injuries. The explosion at Milverton railway station (3 July 1939) may have been the work of McNamee, as he was based in the west midlands of the UK.

McNamee was recalled to Ireland in April 1939 and by 11 June 1939 he was charged with being a member of the I.R.A. and sentenced to six months in Crumlin Road Jail, Belfast. He was released in May 1940 and he returned to Tyrone where he became a leadership figure. In 1941, McNamee was the Commanding Officer of the IRA's Northern Command. In March 1942 IRA Chief of Staff Seán McCool was arrested and imprisoned, and that point the job came to McNamee.

He didn't hold the position long however, as he was later arrested again, this time in Dublin on 23 May 1942. He was given a three-year sentence to be served in the Curragh, where he was placed with hundreds of other men from across Ireland who had been arrested for IRA activity by a Fianna Fáil government determined not to allow the IRA to threaten Ireland's neutrality during World War II. During his time in the Curragh he learned Irish and Spanish, while he raised the eyebrows of some detainees when he described Jesus Christ as "a revolutionary and a socialist".  It was also during this period that he is believed to have become a Trotskyist upon conversations with fellow left-wing IRA members in the camp.

Later life
Following the years spent in the Curragh, McNamee emigrated to the United States. He moved first to Philadelphia before settling in the Chicago area, where he is supposed to have acted as the go-between for the IRA leadership and its weapons suppliers in the U.S. McNamee was another Irish man who took no time away from Army duties to marry. Even after he had established himself in the United States, first in Philadelphia and finally in Chicago. In 1969 when the IRA split between Official IRA and the Provisional IRA, he choose to side with the Provisionals. He was said to be a close friend of fellow IRA man (and acquitted gun-runner) George Harrison.
A Sinn Féin cumann is named in his honor: Eoin McNamee Cumann, Kildress, Co. Tyrone. A monument to his memory stands at a quiet crossroads in the Sperrin Mountains of his native County Tyrone.

Sources

References

1986 deaths
Irish nationalists
Irish republicans
Irish Trotskyists
Year of birth missing
Irish Republican Army (1922–1969) members